Jean-Denis Constant (born 1955), is a male former French international table tennis player.

He won two bronze medals in the men's doubles at the 1973 World Table Tennis Championships and 1975 World Table Tennis Championships with Jacques Secrétin.

See also
 List of table tennis players
 List of World Table Tennis Championships medalists

References

French male table tennis players
1955 births
Living people
World Table Tennis Championships medalists